Stará Ves nad Ondřejnicí is a municipality in Ostrava-City District in the Moravian-Silesian Region of the Czech Republic. It has about 2,900 inhabitants.

Administrative parts
The municipality is made up of villages of Stará Ves and Košatka.

History

The first written mention of Stará Ves is from 1267 in the will of bishop Bruno von Schauenburg.

Sights
The landmark of Stará Ves nad Ondřejnicí is a Renaissance castle built in 1565–1570. It is a two-storey castle with a square floor plan, with a small inner courtyard decorated with open arcades and a tower. The castle is decorated by figural sgraffiti.

The Church of Saint John the Baptist was built in 1587–1589 and is the second most valuable building in the municipality. Near the church is a Baroque rectory.

Twin towns – sister cities

Stará Ves nad Ondřejnicí is twinned with:
 Lipowa, Poland
 Raková, Slovakia

References

External links

Villages in Ostrava-City District